Lösnich is an Ortsgemeinde – a municipality belonging to a Verbandsgemeinde, a kind of collective municipality – in the Bernkastel-Wittlich district in Rhineland-Palatinate, Germany. It belongs to the Verbandsgemeinde of Bernkastel-Kues, whose seat is in the like-named town.

History 
In 1066, Lösnich had its first documentary mention.

Politics 

The council is made up of 8 council members, who were elected by proportional representation at the municipal election held on 7 June 2009, and the honorary mayor as chairman.

The municipal election held on 7 June 2009 yielded the following results:

Culture and sightseeing 

Besides the many old timber-frame houses, the Kesselstatt Amt building, the Late Gothic graveyard chapel and the Gothic Revival parish church from 1869 are all worth seeing.

Economy and infrastructure 
For centuries, Lösnich has been characterized by winegrowing and tourism. There are plans to build the High Moselle Crossing (Hochmoselübergang – a highway link whose centrepiece will be a long, high bridge over the Moselle) on Bundesstraße 50 right near Lösnich.

References

External links 

 Municipality’s official webpage 

Bernkastel-Wittlich